The Shelby Railroad was a 19th-century railway company in the U.S. state of Kentucky. It operated from 1851, when it was created in Shelby County, until 1902, when it was purchased by the Louisville and Nashville Railroad network. Its former rights-of-way currently form parts of the class-I CSX Transportation system. As of 1 October, 2003, the Shelby, aka, the Old Road, has been leased and operated by R J Corman. 

The railroad made up a significant part of the economic success of Shelbyville, Kentucky, after the Civil War, particularly after its 1870 connection to the Louisville, Cincinnati and Lexington Railroad mainline at Anchorage.

See also
 List of Kentucky railroads
 The Shelby Iron Company Railroad in Alabama
 The Calera and Shelby Railroad in Alabama
 The Columbus and Shelby Railroad in Indiana
 The Shelby and Rush Railroad in Indiana
 The Norwalk and Shelby Railroad in Ohio
 The Shelby and Detroit Railroad in Michigan

Defunct Kentucky railroads
Defunct companies based in Kentucky